The 18th National Geographic Bee was held in Washington, D.C. on May 24, 2006, sponsored by the National Geographic Society. The final competition was moderated by Jeopardy! host Alex Trebek. The winner was Bonny Jain of Moline, Illinois, who won a $25,000 college scholarship and lifetime membership in the National Geographic Society. The 2nd-place winner, Neeraj Sirdeshmukh of Nashua, New Hampshire, won a $15,000 scholarship. The 3rd-place winner, Yeshwanth Kandimalla of Marietta, Georgia, won a $10,000 scholarship.

2006 State Champions

References

External links
 National Geographic Bee official website

National Geographic Bee